Leymus is a genus of plants in the grass family Poaceae (Gramineae). It is widespread across Europe, Asia, and the Americas.

 Leymus aemulans  - Xinjiang, Central Asia
 Leymus ajanensis - Siberia, Russian Far East, Alaska
 Leymus akmolinensis  - Siberia, Kazakhstan, European Russia
 Leymus alaicus  - Central Asia
 Leymus altus - Xinjiang
 Leymus ambiguus  - mountains of western US
 Leymus angustus - Altai wild rye - China, Mongolia, Siberia, Central Asia
 Leymus arenarius - lyme grass - Europe
 Leymus aristiglumus - Qinghai
 Leymus × buriaticus  - Siberia
 Leymus cappadocicus  - Turkey, Afghanistan
 Leymus chinensis - China, Korea, Mongolia, Amur, Siberia
 Leymus cinereus - basin wild rye - western North America (US + Canada)
 Leymus condensatus - giant wild rye - California, Baja California, Coahuila
 Leymus crassiusculus - Qinghai, Shanxi
 Leymus divaricatus - Kazakhstan
 Leymus duthiei - China, Korea, Japan, Nepal, northern India
 Leymus erianthus  - Chile, Argentina
 Leymus × fedtschenkoi  - Kyrgyzstan
 Leymus flavescens - Alberta, northwestern US
 Leymus flexilis  - Kyrgyzstan, Kazakhstan
 Leymus flexus - Qinghai, Gansu, Shanxi
 Leymus innovatus - from Alaska + Northwest Territories to South Dakota + Ontario
 Leymus × jenisseiensis - Siberia
 Leymus karelinii  - Xinjiang, Central Asia, European Russia
 Leymus komarovii - China, Mongolia, Korea, Russian Far East
 Leymus kopetdaghensis  - Turkmenistan
 Leymus lanatus - Kyrgyzstan, Tajikistan, Afghanistan
 Leymus latiglumis  - Uzbekistan
 Leymus leptostachyus - Qinghai, Xinjiang
 Leymus mollis - colder parts of Asia + North America 
 Leymus multicaulis - European Russia, Central Asia, Xinjiang
 Leymus × multiflorus  - California
 Leymus mundus - Tibet, Gansu
 Leymus nikitinii  - Turkmenistan
 Leymus oblongolemmatus - Qinghai
 Leymus obvipodus - Qinghai
 Leymus ordensis  - Siberia
 Leymus paboanus  - Russia, China, Mongolia, Central Asia, Afghanistan
 Leymus pacificus  - California
 Leymus paucispiculus - Qinghai, Gansu
 Leymus pendulus  - Qinghai
 Leymus pishanicus  - Xinjiang
 Leymus pluriflorus - Qinghai, Gansu
 Leymus pseudoracemosus  - Qinghai
 Leymus pubinodis - Xinjiang
 Leymus racemosus - mammoth wild rye - Eurasia from Bulgaria to Mongolia
 Leymus × ramosoides  - European Russia
 Leymus ramosus - Eurasia from Crimea to Mongolia
 Leymus ruoqiangensis - Xinjiang, Qinghai
 Leymus salina - western US
 Leymus secalinus  - Siberia, Mongolia, China, Korea, Central Asia, Himalayas
 Leymus shanxiensis - Shanxi
 Leymus sibiricus - Russia from Altai Krai to Magadan
 Leymus × sphacelatus - Tuva
 Leymus spiniformis - Qinghai, Shanxi
 Leymus tianschanicus - Iran, Central Asia, Xinjiang, Inner Mongolia
 Leymus triticoides - creeping wild rye - British Columbia, western US, Baja California, Tamaulipas
 Leymus × tuvinicus  - Siberia
 Leymus × vancouverensis  - British Columbia, Washington, Oregon, California
 Leymus villosissimus  - Yakutia, Magadan, Kamchatka, Alaska, Yukon, Northwest Territories, British Columbia
 Leymus yiunensis - Xinjiang

Butterfly food plant
Butterflies whose caterpillars feed on Leymus include:
 Zabulon skipper, Poanes zabulon

References

 
Grasses of Africa
Grasses of Asia
Grasses of Europe
Grasses of North America
Grasses of South America
Poaceae genera